The ray spiders (Theridiosomatidae) are a family of spiders first described by Eugène Simon in 1881. They are most recognizable for their construction of cone-shaped webs.
The family contains several genera which actively hunt for prey by using their webs to slingshot themselves towards prey.

Genera

, the World Spider Catalog accepts the following genera:

Andasta Simon, 1895 – Seychelles, Malaysia, Sri Lanka
Baalzebub Coddington, 1986 – Central America, Brazil, Australia, China
Chthonopes Wunderlich, 2011 – Laos
Chthonos Coddington, 1986 – Ecuador, Brazil, Peru
Coddingtonia Miller, Griswold & Yin, 2009 – Malaysia, Laos
Cuacuba Prete, Cizauskas & Brescovit, 2018
Epeirotypus O. Pickard-Cambridge, 1894 – Mexico, Costa Rica
Epilineutes Coddington, 1986 – Mexico, Brazil
Karstia Chen, 2010 – China
Menglunia Zhao & Li, 2012 – China
Naatlo Coddington, 1986 – Central America, South America, Trinidad and Tobago
Ogulnius O. Pickard-Cambridge, 1882 – South America, Caribbean, Panama, Asia
Parogulnius Archer, 1953 – United States
Plato Coddington, 1986 – South America, Trinidad
Sinoalaria Zhao & Li, 2014 – China
Tagalogonia Labarque & Griswold, 2014 – Philippines
Theridiosoma O. Pickard-Cambridge, 1879 – South America, Africa, Oceania, North America, Asia, Central America, Jamaica
Wendilgarda Keyserling, 1886 – Asia, São Tomé and Príncipe, Central America, Brazil, Mexico, Caribbean
Zoma Saaristo, 1996 – China, Seychelles

Fossil species 

 †Eoepeirotypus Wunderlich 2004 Baltic amber, Eocene
 †Eotheridiosoma Wunderlich 2004 Bitterfeld amber, Baltic amber, Eocene
 †Palaeoepeirotypus Wunderlich 1988 Dominican amber, Miocene
 †Umerosoma Wunderlich 2004 Baltic amber, Eocene
 †"Baalzebub" mesozoicum  - Vendée amber, France, Turonian later considered to be stem-theridiosomatid

See also
 List of Theridiosomatidae species

References

External links

Spiders of South America
Theridiosomatidae